The painter, illustrator and curator Archibald Eliot Haswell Miller was born in Glasgow (1887–1979). After teaching at Glasgow School of Art, between 1910 and 1930, he went on to be keeper and then Deputy Director of the National Galleries of Scotland, Edinburgh (1930 to 1952). His artwork is owned by The Imperial War Museum, London; Glasgow Museums and Art Galleries and Hunterian Museum and Art Gallery, both Glasgow.

Education 
Miller studied at The Glasgow School of Art under Maurice Greiffenhagen and Jean Delville (1906 -1909) and also travelled to study in Paris, Vienna, Munich and Berlin. He is commemorated in The Glasgow School of Art's World War One Roll of Honour, where he is listed as a Captain in the Highland Light Infantry. He was decorated with a Military Cross.

Professional life 
Haswell Miller taught at Glasgow School of Art 1910 and 1930. Between 1930 and 1952 he was keeper and then Deputy Director of the National Galleries of Scotland, Edinburgh. 
His work was exhibited at the Royal Academy and also at the Royal Scottish Academy. He was elected a member of the Royal Scottish Society of Painters in Watercolour in 1924.

As a painter he specialised military portraits, landscapes and architectural subjects. His work is in the collections of The Imperial War Museum, Glasgow Museum and Art Galleries and The Hunterian Museum and Art Gallery,

GLAHA 55598
GLAHA 55606
GLAHA 55611

Family
A. E. Haswell Miller was married to the artist Elizabeth Josephine Cameron, later known as Josephine Haswell Miller. He lived in Edinburgh, but latterly in Kington Magna, Dorset. A. E. Haswell Miller died in 1979.

References

1887 births
1979 deaths
Alumni of the Glasgow School of Art